Blackjoe is an unincorporated community and coal town in Harlan County, Kentucky, United States. Their Post Office closed in 1935

References

Unincorporated communities in Harlan County, Kentucky
Unincorporated communities in Kentucky
Coal towns in Kentucky